Patrick Breen, Wexford, was the eighth president of the Gaelic Athletic Association (1924-1926).

As a football player, Breen won two All-Ireland senior medals, one with Dublin in 1902, one with Wexford in 1914.

Breen held a variety of administrative positions at all levels. At county level, he served as secretary and chairman; he was a member of Leinster council for 25 years, serving as its chairman from 1922 to 1923.

In 1922, Breen came to prominence at Congress when he spoke out against the Ban (Rule 27, which forbade the playing or promotion of foreign games).

References

 

Year of birth missing
Year of death missing
Alumni of St Patrick's College, Dublin
Chairmen of county boards of the Gaelic Athletic Association
Chairmen of Gaelic games governing bodies 
Dublin County Board administrators
Dublin inter-county Gaelic footballers
Leinster Provincial Council administrators
Presidents of the Gaelic Athletic Association
Secretaries of county boards of the Gaelic Athletic Association
Wexford inter-county Gaelic footballers